Realms of Horror is a "supermodule" compiled from the S–series of Dungeons & Dragons modules, which were four distinct Advanced Dungeons & Dragons 1st edition adventure modules, designed for use by Dungeon Masters as pre-made scenarios that are ready to be played with minimal preparation.

Plot summary
Realms of Horror contains four adventure scenarios collected from previously published modules coded S1 through S4, which have been reformatted into a connected adventure campaign.

Publication history
The "S," standing for "Special," in the series' name is the first part of the alphanumeric code used to indicate related modules. The four S–series modules were released over the four-year period between 1978 and 1982.

S1-4 Realms of Horror was written by Gary Gygax and Lawrence Schick with Wm. John Wheeler, with a cover by Larry Elmore, and was published by TSR in 1987 as an 80-page book, a 48-page art booklet, a 16-page map booklet, and an outer folder.

Reception
All four of the modules were in Dungeon's 2004 article, "The 30 Greatest D&D Adventures of All Time"

See also

 List of Dungeons & Dragons modules

Notes

References
  
 
 Schick, Lawrence (1991). Heroic Worlds. Prometheus Books
 
 

Greyhawk modules
Role-playing game supplements introduced in 1987